Hanabusa (written:  or ) is a Japanese surname. Notable people with the surname include:

Colleen Hanabusa (born 1951), American politician
, Japanese painter, calligrapher, and haiku poet
, son and pupil of Hanabusa Itchō
, Japanese samurai
, Japanese photographer
, Japanese film director
, Japanese manga artist
, Japanese politician and diplomat
, Japanese actress

Japanese-language surnames